The Byzeres were a people of the Southern Caucasus mentioned  in Urartean sources as Uiterukhi or Uitirukhi. Sardur II conquered their lands, appointed a deputy and made it a province. According to the Ancient Greek sources, Byzeres inhabited near the southeast coast of the Black Sea, south of the Ch'orokhi River and partly the Pontic Mountains as well. The name of the historical region Odzrkhe is derived from the name of this tribe – Vidzerukh/Viterukh/Odzr(a)khe/Odzrkhe.

The Georgian Soviet encyclopedia identifies the Byzeres ( bidzerebi) as "an ancient Georgian [Kartvelian] tribe"

See also
 Odzrkhe

References

Ancient peoples of Georgia (country)